Canada–Kazakhstan relations are foreign relations between Canada and Kazakhstan. The countries established diplomatic relations with each other in 1992. Canada has an embassy in Nur-Sultan. Kazakhstan has an embassy in Ottawa and a consulate in Toronto.

Both countries are full members of the Organization for Security and Co-operation in Europe. The President of Kazakhstan, Nursultan Nazarbayev, made an official visit to Canada in May 2003.

Political

Canada and Kazakhstan established diplomatic relations with each other in 1992. Canada established an embassy in Almaty, which it later moved to Astana. Kazakhstan is represented in Canada through its embassy in Ottawa. On March 31, 2009, Kazakh President Nursultan Nazarbayev met with Canada's ex-prime minister Jean Chrétien to discuss deepening mutual relations. After their conversation, Chrétien went on to say, "We should use new economic opportunities. It is high time to start new projects. During the talks with Kazakh President we discussed cooperation in various spheres. Kazakhstan and Canada can work together". Also in 2009, Kazakh Prime Minister Karim Massimov met with Canadian Senator Consiglio Di Nino.

On November 13, 2013, Kazakhstan and Canada Foreign Minister John Baird signed a new agreement of peaceful atomic energy and new technology. The two also discussed agriculture and visa regimes.

Economic
Initial trade and investment between the two countries focused on agriculture and mining, with nominal but decreasing exports of oil and gas machinery from Canada to Kazakhstan. According to Rod Lever, the Chief Representative to Russia for Export Development Canada, "Kazakhstan has been able to develop commercial relations with Canada keyed to shared strengths in agriculture and extractive industries", and there is an increased emphasis in Canadian export of aerospace and telecommunications equipment, such as regional jets. The focus on agriculture has led to Canadian equipment gaining nearly 25 percent of the agriculture and machinery market in Kazakhstan.

Canadian exports to Kazakhstan have been growing steadily, and increased by over 50% in 2007 to reach a total of CAD $182.7 million for that year, from $138 million in 2005. As of 2008, there are 170 Canadian companies active in the market and more than forty with a permanent presence there. Canada is also among the top ten foreign investors in the country, with investments totaling more than two billion CAD.

Canadian Ambassadors to Kazakhstan 
 Bell, Michael Richard 1992
 Kinsman, Jeremy K.B. 1992/08
 Mann, Richard 1996/08/19
 Skinner, Gerald R. 1999/08/11 (1999/11/09)
 Cowan, Hector 2001/07/16 (2001/10/17)
 Biolik, Anna 2004/08/09 (2004/09)
 Dap, Margaret 2006/06/14 (2006/10/18)
 Millar, Stephen 2009/07/15 (2009/11/19)
Style, Sean 2014/03/24 (2014/08/12)
 Nicolas Brousseau 2017/08/17 (2017/10/19

See also
 Foreign relations of Canada
 Foreign relations of Kazakhstan

References

External links
  Canadian Ministry of Foreign Affairs and International Trade about relations with Kazakhstan
  Canadian embassy in Almaty

 
Kazakhstan 
Bilateral relations of Kazakhstan